Star Wars: The Clone Wars, written by Karen Traviss, is the novelization of the animated film Star Wars: The Clone Wars. The audio book is narrated by Jeff Gurner. It is the first in a series of five novels designed to tie into the events of the movie and the animated series. The book was released almost three weeks before the film was released. Because of this there are some discrepancies between the book and the film. This book, like the movie and series, is set between Star Wars: Episode II - Attack of the Clones and Star Wars: Episode III - Revenge of the Sith.

Summary
The story follows the heroic Jedi Knights as they struggle to maintain order and restore peace during the tumultuous Clone Wars. More and more systems are falling prey to the forces of the dark side as the Galactic Republic slips further and further under the sway of the Separatists and their never-ending droid army. Anakin Skywalker and his Padawan learner Ahsoka Tano find themselves on a mission with far-reaching consequences, one that brings them face-to-face with crime lord Jabba the Hutt. But Count Dooku and his sinister agents, including the nefarious Asajj Ventress, will stop at nothing to ensure that Anakin and Ahsoka fail at their quest. Meanwhile, on the front lines of the Clone Wars, Obi-Wan Kenobi and Master Yoda lead the massive clone army in a valiant effort to resist the forces of the dark side.

Differences from the Movie
The book was released before the movie, Star Wars: The Clone Wars, was released. Because of this, there are some differences between the movie and the book. One difference is the Battle of Teth. In the movie, after the clones are defeated and Asajj Ventress and her droids are closing in on the surviving clones, there are six troopers instead of five like in the movie. Also, the character dialogue in the book is much different than in the film.

References

External links
 Star Wars Vault, Del Rey & LucasBooks announce Clone Wars Novels
 Random House Book Page
The Clone Wars on Wookieepedia

2008 novels
2008 science fiction novels
Military science fiction novels
Novels based on films
Star Wars Legends novels
Del Rey books
Books based on Star Wars